Mohamed Kamouna (Arabic:محمد كمونة; born 13 June 1969), is a retired Egyptian footballer

Honours

Club
Zamalek SC
9 Titles with El Zamalek:
Egyptian Premier League:  2000-01, 2002-03
Egypt Cup:  1998–99, 2001–02
Egyptian Super Cup:  2001, 2002
CAF Champions League:  2002
African Cup Winners' Cup:2000
CAF Super Cup: 2003

References

External links
 

1969 births
Living people
Egyptian footballers
Egypt international footballers
Association football forwards
Zamalek SC players
1996 African Cup of Nations players
Egyptian Premier League players
People from Dakahlia Governorate
El Mansoura SC players
Haras El Hodoud SC players
El Shams SC players
20th-century Egyptian people